Auguste Xoagus is a Namibian politician. A member of SWAPO, Xoagus was a regional councilor for his party in the northwestern Kunene Region prior to his election to the 5th National Assembly of Namibia in 2009.

References

Year of birth missing (living people)
Living people
SWAPO politicians
Members of the National Assembly (Namibia)
People from Kunene Region